Uusi tietosanakirja is an encyclopedia in Finnish. It was published as a series of 26 volumes in 1960 and 1972. It describes subjects from a Finnish point of view. Chief editor was Veli Valpola and publisher, Tietosanakirja Oy. The total number of articles is over 130,000. It was sold 30,000 series.

Finnish-language encyclopedias
1960s books
1970s books